Thavarina Siri is a 2006 Indian Kannada-language drama film directed by Om Sai Prakash and written by Ajay Kumar. The film cast includes Shiva Rajkumar, Daisy Bopanna, Ashitha, Ashwini among others. The film was produced by Ramu while the original score and soundtrack were composed by Hamsalekha.

The film released on 19 May 2006 to average response where the critics noted the comparisons between the same team's earlier ventures like Thavarige Baa Thangi (2002) and Anna Thangi.

Cast
 Shiva Rajkumar as Mutthanna
 Daisy Bopanna 
 Ashitha
 Ashwini
 Adarsha 
  Hema Chaudhary 
 Ramesh Bhat
  Mukhyamantri Chandru 
 Tennis Krishna
 Doddanna
 Sadhu Kokila
 Karthik Sharma

Soundtrack
The music of the film was composed and lyrics written by Hamsalekha.

References

External source

 Tavarina Siri - Richly made film

2006 films
2000s Kannada-language films
Indian drama films
Films scored by Hamsalekha
Films directed by Sai Prakash
2006 drama films